CSM Corona Brașov is a sports club form Brașov, Romania.

Teams include:
Corona Brașov (women's handball)
CSM Corona Brașov (football)
CSM Corona Brașov (ice hockey)

Sport in Brașov
Sports clubs in Romania